Blackamoor is a type of figure/visual trope in European decorative art, typically found in works from the Early Modern period, depicting a man of presumably African descent, in clothing that suggests lowly status and encourages sexual objectification. Common examples of items and objects decorated in the blackamoor style include sculpture, jewellery, and furniture. Typically the sculpted figures carried something, such as candles or a tray. They were thus an exotic and lightweight variant for the "atlas" in architecture and decorative arts, especially popular in the Rococo period.

The term "blackamoor" or "black moor" was once a general term for black people in English, "formerly without depreciatory force" as the Oxford English Dictionary puts it. The style is now viewed by some as racist and culturally insensitive. However, blackamoor pieces are still produced, mainly in Venice, Italy.

Jewelry and decorative arts 

In jewelry, blackamoor figures usually appear in antique Venetian earrings, bracelets, cuff links, and brooches.

Some contemporary craftspeople continue to make individual pieces; however, production of blackamoor jewelry is becoming more rare, due to the decorative style increasingly being viewed as problematic and offensive for its depiction of dark-skinned people as "exotic" and decorative.

Blackamoor figures are typically male, depicted with a head covering, usually a turban, and covered in rich jewels and gold leaf. Sculptures are typically carved from ebony, or painted black to contrast with the bright colors of the embellishments. Depictions may only represent the head, or head and shoulders, facing the viewer in a symmetrical pose.

In decorative sculpture, the full body is depicted, either to hold trays as a servant figure, or bronze sconces to hold candles or light fixtures. They may be incorporated into small stands, tables, or andirons, and are often portrayed in pairs. Often, blackamoor figures are depicted in acrobatic positions that would be physically impossible to hold for any extended length of time. Notable sculptors of blackamoor figures include Andrea Brustolon (1662–1732), who is considered by some to be the most important artist of blackamoor sculptures.

Collections 

Aleksandr Pushkin had a blackamoor figurine on his desk to remind him of Abram Petrovich Gannibal, his great-grandfather. This figure can be seen in his former St. Petersburg apartment, now turned into a museum.

Diana Vreeland had a famous collection of blackamoor jewelry, and Anita Pointer of the Pointer Sisters has some blackamoor pieces in her extensive collection of black memorabilia.

Heraldry 

In heraldry, a blackamoor may be a charge in the blazon, or description of a coat of arms. The isolated head of a moor is blazoned "a Maure" or a "moor's head".

The reasons for the inclusion of a blackamoor head vary. The Moor's head on the crest that appears on the arms of Lord Kirkcudbright, and in consequence the modern crest badge used by Clan MacLellan is supposed to derive from the killing of a moorish bandit known as Black Morrow. The blazon is a naked arm supporting on the point of a sword, a moor's head. Other examples appear to depict captives; the flag of Sardinia and the neighboring Corsica, derived from the coat of arms of Aragon, depict Maures' heads with bandanas.

Sculpture 

Blackamoor figures were also used in larger sculptures, such as on Blackamoor Bridge in Ulriksdal Palace, Sweden.

Fred Wilson, an African-American sculptor, displayed an installation at the 2003 Venice Biennale that incorporated blackamoors. Wilson placed wooden blackamoors carrying acetylene torches and fire extinguishers. Wilson noted that such figures are so common in Venice, few people notice them. He said, "They are in hotels everywhere in Venice ... which is great, because all of a sudden you see them everywhere. I wanted it to be visible, this whole world which sort of just blew up for me."

Racism 
Blackamoors have a long history in decorative art, stretching all the way back to 17th century Italy and the famous sculptor Andrea Brustolon (1662–1732). They are often recognized for depictions of slaves and the ornamental pieces that they inspired.

In modern times, the blackamoor is considered to have racist connotations, with its association to colonialism and slavery. Art historian Adrienne Childs criticised the "romanticised" depictions and interpretations of blackamoor pieces, arguing that the depictions of black people in the blackamoor style obscured and made palatable the existence of slaves in the colonies, and evidenced "a culture that marginalised and dominated blacks".

See also 
 Black Madonna
 Cigar store Indian
 Lawn jockey
 Concrete Aboriginal
 Representation of slavery in European art

References

External links 

Article on Blackamoor imagery in European heraldry

Antiques
Black people in art
Collecting
Decorative arts
Furniture
Heraldic charges
History of sculpture
Stereotypes of black people